Christina Baker Kline (born 1964) is an American novelist. She is the author of seven novels, including Orphan Train, and has co-authored or edited five non-fiction books. Kline is a Geraldine R. Dodge Foundation Fellowship recipient.

Background
She was born in Cambridge, England, and raised in Cambridge, the American South, and in Maine. She is a graduate of Yale (BA in English), Cambridge University (MA in literature), and the University of Virginia (MFA), where she was a Henry Hoyns Fellow in fiction writing.

Teaching career
Kline served as Writer-in-Residence at Fordham University from 2007 to 2011, where she taught graduate and undergraduate creative writing and literature.

Works

Fiction
 Sweet Water (1993)
 Desire Lines (1999)
 The Way Life Should Be (2007)
 Bird in Hand (2009)
 Orphan Train (2013)
 A Piece of the World (2017) 
 Orphan Train Girl (2017)
 The Exiles (2020)Orphan Train
Set on present-day Mount Desert Island, Maine  and in Depression-era Minnesota, Kline's fifth novel, Orphan Train, highlights the real-life story of the orphan trains that between 1854 and 1929 carried thousands of orphaned, abandoned, and destitute children from the East Coast to the Midwest. Since its publication in 2013, Orphan Train has been a bestseller on all the national lists in the U.S.

Non-fiction
 The Conversation Begins: Mothers and Daughters Talk about Living Feminism (1994), with her mother, Christina Looper Baker.

As editor
 Child of Mine: Original Essays on Becoming a Mother (1997)
 Room to Grow: Twenty-Two Writers Encounter the Pleasures and Paradoxes of Raising Young Children (1999)
 Always Too Soon: Voices of Support for Those Who Have Lost Both Parents (2006), with Allison Gilbert
 About Face: Women Write about What They See When They Look in the Mirror'' (2008), with Anne Burt

Me Too campaign
As part of the #MeToo campaign, in late October 2017, Baker Kline penned an essay published by Slate magazine in which she accused former president George H. W. Bush of inappropriately touching her and telling an inappropriate joke while she posed for a photo with him during an April 2014 event benefiting the Barbara Bush Foundation for Family Literacy. She further stated that the driver who chauffeured her (and had "introduced herself as a friend of the Bush family"), overheard her tell the story to her husband and requested that she remain "discreet" about the incident. Baker Kline stated in her essay that the driver's reaction made her suspicious that her case was not unique, thinking that "the people around President Bush were accustomed to doing damage control," and the #MeToo campaign confirmed her suspicions.

References

External links

 Official website
 USA Today: 'Orphan Train' on surprise trip up the best-seller list
 Forbes Magazine: How A Veteran Novelist Leveraged Target's Sales Clout And The Hidden Power Of The Paperback To Crack The Bestseller List
 Publishers Weekly: With 'Orphan Train,' Author Finds Bestsellerdom Fifth Time Around

1964 births
Living people
20th-century American novelists
21st-century American novelists
American women novelists
Writers from Bangor, Maine
Yale University alumni
20th-century American women writers
21st-century American women writers
English emigrants to the United States
People from Cambridge
Alumni of Selwyn College, Cambridge
University of Virginia alumni
Novelists from Maine
American women non-fiction writers
20th-century American non-fiction writers
21st-century American non-fiction writers